Starlite Walker is the first studio album by indie rock group Silver Jews. It was released in 1994 as an LP and CD on Drag City (DC55) in America and on Domino (WIG15) in Europe.

Production
Starlite Walker was recorded in 1994 at Easley Recordings, in Memphis, Tennessee. It was produced by Davis McCain, Doug Easley, and the band. David Berman claimed that "Trains Across the Sea" was the first song that he ever composed.

Critical reception
Trouser Press wrote that "while it gets laid-back enough at times to pass for a long-lost New Riders of the Purple Sage album, Starlite Walker possesses enough temperate charm to soothe even the most savage discordophile." Drowned in Sound wrote that the album "may very well be the greatest jam session of half-formed ideas ever made."

Track listing
All tracks composed by David Berman; except where indicated

 "Introduction II"
 "Trains Across the Sea"
 "The Moon Is the Number 18"
 "Advice to the Graduate"
 "Tide to the Oceans" (Berman, Stephen Malkmus)
 "Pan American Blues"
 "New Orleans"
 "The Country Diary of a Subway Conductor"
 "Living Waters"
 "Rebel Jew"
 "The Silver Pageant"

Personnel

Personnel 
The Silver Jews
David Berman – lead vocals, guitar, piano, percussion
Stephen Malkmus – guitar, backing vocals, piano, bass, percussion
Steve West – drums, backing vocals, percussion
Bob Nastanovich – drums, backing vocals, percussion, synthesizer
Additional personnel
Doug Easley – pedal steel guitar; whistle on "Living Waters"
David McCain — pink noise
Andra Sherman — triangle
Dan Mackta — Wurlitzer electric piano on "The Country Diary of a Subway Conductor"
David McCain – engineer, producer
Doug Easley – engineer, producer
Billy Smith – photography

References

1994 albums
Domino Recording Company albums
Drag City (record label) albums
Silver Jews albums